Diego Schwartzman was the defending champion, but lost in the final to Facundo Argüello, 7–5, 6–3.

Seeds

Draw

Finals

Top half

Bottom half

References
 Main Draw
 Qualifying Draw

Campeonato Internacional de Tenis de Campinas - Singles
2015 Singles